Halfa is an unincorporated community in Emmet County, Iowa, United States.

History
Halfa was platted in 1899. It was named after Wadi Halfa, in the Sudan. A post office was established in Halfa in 1900, and remained in operation until it was discontinued in 1932.

Halfa's population was 52 in 1925.

References

Unincorporated communities in Emmet County, Iowa
Unincorporated communities in Iowa